Thiago Agustín Tirante was the defending champion but lost in the semifinals to Facundo Bagnis.

Bagnis won the title after defeating João Lucas Reis da Silva 7–6(9–7), 6–4 in the final.

Seeds

Draw

Finals

Top half

Bottom half

References

External links
Main draw
Qualifying draw

Ambato La Gran Ciudad - 1